Ramón Tomás Díaz Gaspar, CBE (Montevideo, 30 May 1926 – 7 January 2017) was an influential Uruguayan journalist, lawyer and economist.

He presided over the Central Bank of Uruguay (1990–1993).

An advocate of the liberal thought in Uruguay, he was a member of the Mont Pelerin Society, which he presided in 1998.

References 

1926 births
2017 deaths
Presidents of the Central Bank of Uruguay
People from Montevideo
Uruguayan people of Spanish descent
University of the Republic (Uruguay) alumni
20th-century Uruguayan lawyers
Directors of the Office of Planning and Budgeting of Uruguay
Uruguayan economists
Uruguayan journalists
Commanders of the Order of the British Empire